The Indian 1-rupee note (₹1) is made up of hundred 100 paise as ₹1 = 100 paise. Currently, it is the smallest Indian banknote in circulation and the only one being issued by the Government of India, as all other banknotes in circulation are issued by the Reserve Bank of India. As a result, the one rupee note is the only note bearing the signature of the Finance Secretary and not the Governor of the RBI.

Predominantly pinkish green paper is used during printing. Printing of these notes were first stopped in 1926, then restarted in 1940 and continued until 1994, when it was stopped again due to cost-cutting measures. Printing resumed for a second time in 2015. The newly-printed notes were first released on 5 March 2015 at Srinathji Temple, Rajasthan by Rajiv Mehrishi, Finance Secretary. Once again RBI decided to issue these notes as per publication in the official Gazei.e. on 7 February 2020.

Languages

As like the other Indian rupee banknotes, the 1 banknote has its amount written in 17 languages. On the obverse, the denomination is written in English and Hindi. On the reverse is a language panel which displays the denomination of the note in 15 of the 22 official languages of India. The languages are displayed in alphabetical order. Languages included on the panel are Assamese, Bengali, Gujarati, Kannada, Kashmiri, Konkani, Malayalam, Marathi, Nepali, Odia, Punjabi, Sanskrit, Tamil, Telugu and Urdu.

Gallery

See also
Indian 1-rupee note
Indian 2-rupee note

References 

Rupee
Banknotes of India
One-base-unit banknotes